Stuart Hall (born 24 February 1980) is a British former professional boxer who competed from 2008 to 2018. He held the IBF bantamweight world title from 2013 to 2014, and challenged twice for the same title in 2014 and 2016. At regional level, he held the British bantamweight title from 2010 to 2011 and the Commonwealth bantamweight title in 2012.

Early professional career
Hall made his professional boxing debut on 26 April 2008 with a win over Abdul Mghrbel in his home town of Darlington. The win was followed with another victory on 6 October 2008 against undefeated seven fight prospect Dougie Walton this time at the Holiday Inn in Birmingham. The two wins meant an undefeated start to his debut year in the ring.

On 16 January 2009 he recorded his first win of the new year travelling to Middlesbrough to defeat Nick Seager before on 29 March 2009 meeting Stuart McFadyen and only registering a draw at the fight held in Bolton.  Three more fights followed the McFadyen result with Hall winning on each occasions against the likes of journeyman Anthony Hanna and Jason Thomas and then notably on 11 November travelling to Brentford to meet former British champion Martin Power and winning in the 8th round. Hall's first fight of 2010 resulted in another points win on 12 February at the York Hall against Hungarian Richard Szebeledi meaning that Hall now boasted an unbeaten record of seven wins against only one draw.

British champion

Hall vs. Napa 
On 4 June 2010 Hall stepped into the ring against the former British and European champion Ian Napa and claimed the title in a shock result following Napa's decision not to come out for the start of the 9th round. The experienced Napa had complained about the heat at the venue in Peterlee and the fact that the making the bantamweight limit had been very hard. In contrast Hall described the result saying "It's unbelievable, a dream come true" as he claimed the title in only his 9th professional fight.

Hall vs. Power 
Hall returned to the ring shortly afterwards for his first defence on 23 July 2010 with a return match against former victim and former champion Martin Power. The fight, this time in Sunderland, once again resulted in victory for Hall with the referee stopping the contest in the 10th round with Hall having been dominant throughout.

Hall vs. Davies 
On 13 November 2010 on the undercard of the Heavyweight world title fight between David Haye and Audley Harrison Hall defended his belt for the second time beating former champion Gary Davies in the 7th round and claimed that there was "more to come".

Hall vs. Belt 
Hall claimed the Lonsdale Belt outright with a successful third defense on 9 April 2011 beating John Donnelly at the Rainton Meadows Arena in Houghton-le-Spring, stopping him in the fifth round. Hall said of his achievement of winning the belt outright "this is my world title, it's just unbelievable that I've got this for the rest of my life. It's such an achievement for Darlington and the north east."

Hall vs. Butler 
On 17 September, 2017, Hall fought Paul Butler, ranked #5 by the WBA and IBF and #9 by the WBO at bantamweight. Butler won the fight via unanimous decision.

Hall vs. McDonnell 
In his next bout, Hall faced Gavin McDonnell, ranked #3 by the WBC, #4 by the WBA and #11 by the IBF at super bantamweight. McDonnell won the fight via unanimous decision, winning on all three scorecards, 117-111, 117-111 and 115-113.

Professional boxing record

See also
List of world bantamweight boxing champions
List of British world boxing champions

References

External links

Stuart Hall - Profile, News Archive & Current Rankings at Box.Live

|-

|-

1980 births
Living people
English male boxers
Sportspeople from Darlington
Bantamweight boxers
World bantamweight boxing champions
British Boxing Board of Control champions
Commonwealth Boxing Council champions
International Boxing Federation champions